Doug Tracht is an American radio, television, and movie personality. He is nicknamed "The Greaseman".

Personal
Tracht was born and grew up in the South Bronx with his younger sister, Diana, and parents, Alfred and Gertrude Tracht. His father was a native New Yorker who sold dental supplies; his mother was a Lutheran immigrant from Germany who stayed home to raise her two children until they were in high school, then became a noted educator. Tracht attended DeWitt Clinton High School and graduated in 1968. He majored in broadcasting at Ithaca College and landed a job at the college radio station. "From the first day I got on the air, I was trying to do comedy bits and tell jokes. After my first year in college, I had this station (WYSL) in Buffalo, New York, offer me a big time job." Tracht got a job at WTKO, a low-power top-40 station in Ithaca. The following year, he had moved up to night DJ at a larger station in Binghamton, New York, WENE. Tracht graduated from Ithaca College in 1972
and married Marie Massara who was the sales secretary at WENE.

Pseudonym
The Greaseman pseudonym originated while he was in college. "In those days of top 40, everybody who was on the radio was 'cookin'; cookin' with the Temptations, cookin' Four Tops, that kind of thing. Which meant they were really rockin'. One day I said I was cookin' with heavy grease. It was my way of saying I was out-cookin' the other guys. I said it enough times, so one day one of the other deejays referred to me as the Greaseman."
His radio name had been Dougie T, but when he became the Greaseman, a different personality surfaced. His voice deepened and he projected the image of a middle-aged tattooed truck driver with a beer belly and a cigar. In reality, Tracht was 6 foot 2 and 150 pounds. He used the radio as an alter ego; a guy with a swaggering bravado. At WENE, he was asked to do remote broadcasts from a sponsor's business and listeners were disappointed to see that he looked like a wimp.  In later years, Tracht took up bodybuilding to improve his physique.

Radio show
"The Greaseman Show" is a fast-paced array of what he terms "bits." Calls from listeners inevitably lead to a story of a recurring character from his repertoire, and no topic is taboo. He calls his deep voice his "basso grosso" or "basso profundo."
As The Greaseman, Tracht invented a clever way of getting around limits on indecent language by using slang terms for body parts and functions that he invented. His listeners knew the meanings of the terms. In this way, he managed to directly discuss very explicitly adult topics without alerting censors, or alarming parents who did not understand the private language.

Career

Early career
Tracht went through a string of stations including WAXC in Rochester, New York, WRC in Washington, D.C., and WPOP in Hartford, Connecticut. He lost his job at WPOP when that station switched its format from pop music to all news in 1975. He lost the job at WRC because program director Gordon Peil wanted Tracht to drop the Greaseman personality. The frequent moves from city to city were a major reason for the end of his first marriage, after less than two years.

Success
Tracht found a home at WAPE in Jacksonville, Florida, in August 1975 and became the dominant radio personality not just in northeast Florida but in the Southeastern United States. While in Jacksonville, his true identity was kept confidential because the public was disappointed that the booming, macho voice belonged to a young guy who was skinny and shy. The station turned Tracht's request for privacy into a marketing ploy. Curtains were hung in the window of the broadcast booth, a TV interview showed only his lips, and Tracht wore a gorilla costume at personal appearances. Tracht was named as the top radio personality in the United States for 1977 and 1980. In 1979, he signed a five-year contract worth $1 million.

He was an early shock jock, but Tracht denies the label: "I'm telling jokes. The bottom line—it's a comedy show." "I'm creating characters and stories, I'm weaving a tapestry of humor. The others are just saying nasty things."
However, his show was outrageous and edgy, which offended some people. Tracht kept his stories from violating FCC obscenity regulations by using "code words" for certain anatomical features (hydraulics for male genitalia, fudge packing for anal sex, for instance) and sound effects for physical acts.

Allen Moore, WAPE's news director, was also a bodybuilder. Tracht questioned Moore about his hobby, and Moore encouraged Tracht to try it. Tracht began a high protein diet of canned tuna, raw eggs, and milk; took vitamins; and lifted weights for 90 minutes a day. In the first three months, he added 25 pounds of muscle to his thin physique. After a year, he had gained 45 pounds, and people commented that he looked like Arnold Schwarzenegger. Tracht enrolled in an evening law enforcement training program, and after completing it, he volunteered as an auxiliary officer. He occasionally worked the night shift with the Clay County Sheriff's Office, then went directly to the station at 5:30 a.m. for his morning show, still in uniform. One of his most popular bits was stories portraying what it would be like to be a lawman. He would state "What it must be like to strap on a gun, pin on a badge and become a lawman" under the theme song to the TV program SWAT.

On May 25, 1979, Tracht gained national attention when he mocked convicted murderer John Spenkelink, who was due to be executed in "Old Sparky," the Florida State Prison electric chair, that day. Tracht aired a recording of sizzling bacon and dedicated it to Spenkelink, telling him to get used to the sound.

Tracht remained in Jacksonville almost seven years, then moved in 1982 to WWDC-FM in Washington, D.C., where he replaced Howard Stern. DC-101 was his first FM station. He purchased a home in nearby Potomac, Maryland, continued working out, and overcame his dislike of public appearances. During that time, he was known for a series of publicity stunts, including his "presidential campaign" in 1984.

WMATA (DC subway rail service) audio-skit

One of his audio-skits was a story of himself as an explorer being chased.  The story was complete with bongos playing in the background with intermittent screeches of wild jungle birds.  The implication was he was being chased by cannibals in the jungle.  The bongo drums became louder and louder as the story progressed, implying those chasing him were getting closer and closer and he was getting more and more desperate to escape.  The story ended just as he was about to be caught when he "...jumped on the Red Line and went home!"

Martin Luther King Day comment
In January 1986, Tracht created an uproar by telling an on-air joke regarding the new federal holiday, Martin Luther King Day.  Tracht said, "Why don't we shoot four more and get the whole week off?" followed by, "Come on, now, you know I don't mean nothin'!" He was suspended from the station for five days, publicly apologized, and donated money to create a scholarship at Howard University in honor of Dr. King. The Washington Post noted that he was the highest paid DJ in D.C. during 1987, making $400,000 a year.

Syndication
His show was syndicated by Infinity Broadcasting Corporation for five years, from January 1993 until January 1998. Tracht moved to Los Angeles, where his show originated from a private broadcasting studio in LA, and was carried by stations in Atlanta, New York, Philadelphia, Baltimore, Washington, D.C., and KLOS in Los Angeles, among others. During 1994 his audience was estimated at 2.5 million listeners each day.

Syndication was not as successful as Infinity had hoped, so the contract was not extended beyond five years. In the last year of his Infinity contract, he was hired by WARW-FM for $1 million per year and returned to Washington, D.C., where he again incorporated music into his show.

James Byrd comment
On February 24, 1999, after a year at WARW (now WIAD), Tracht made a comment about James Byrd Jr., who was murdered in 1998 by being dragged behind a pickup truck by three men, two determined to be white supremacists. The day before, jurors had convicted John William King of Byrd's murder. Tracht had been playing a sound bite of Lauryn Hill who had ten nominations at the 41st Grammy Awards. Tracht then stated, "No wonder people drag them behind trucks." After the comment, he immediately stated that he "didn't mean nothin'." This incident proved catastrophic to his radio career, igniting a firestorm of protest from listeners of all races, including Donnie Simpson, who lambasted Tracht on his morning show on sister station WPGC-FM. Not only was Tracht quickly fired from WARW, but he also lost his position as a volunteer deputy sheriff in Falls Church, Virginia.

Apology
Rock Newman was a black businessman who knew Tracht before the incident. Newman felt that Tracht was truly sorry and accompanied Doug and his wife on a quest to apologize and show that he wasn't a racist. The week following his firing, Tracht held a press conference and made an apology to his listeners, "Every day you deserve my best, and last Wednesday I gave you my worst. This experience, compiled with my past transgressions upon racial and human decency, have forever taught me the value of respect and restraint." They spoke to several black organizations, then appeared on BET Tonight with Tavis Smiley on Black Entertainment Television where he faced angry questions. After being confronted by one caller, Tracht begged, "Let me down off this cross, will you?" Counseling was recommended. The show asked its audience what Tracht could do, but almost 75 percent said "nothing."

Penance
A worker at DC Central Kitchen saw Tracht's apology on TV and heard his desire to show he was sorry. She thought that the "Kitchen" would be a good place for him to prove himself, and shared the idea with a co-worker who knew Rock Newman; he made a phone call. Soon, Tracht was mopping floors and cleaning bathrooms for four hours a day, several times a week. He volunteered for four months, laboring with unemployed and homeless people. Of the experience, Tracht stated: "It's the kind of place where you can rediscover yourself. I did things I'd never done in my life. I went in there like an idiot, and now I know how to clean and mop, how to shovel and unload, how to slice and dice."

Tracht began counseling with a psychologist at Howard University. After the counselor got to know his patient, he stated, "I saw nothing consistent with what I would expect to find with someone who is a racist." Tracht continued to see the therapist weekly for over a year.

In February 2000, a station owner in Saint Croix, U.S. Virgin Islands, offered Tracht a DJ job. Tracht intended to make a new start, but when local residents found out about it, they objected. Local politicians talked to the station owner, who was persuaded to rescind the offer.

Tracht had a part in the Discovery Channel's show The FBI Files and appeared in an infomercial for an internet dating site in 2000.

Later career
In 2002, Tracht returned to the air from his home studio, broadcasting on WDMV AM 700 (previously WGOP) near Frederick, Maryland, and was soon afterward syndicated to numerous other stations in the region. He then held the morning-show slot on WMET AM 1160 in Gaithersburg, Maryland, until November 2, 2007. The Washington Post has described this period as "six years of broadcasting his morning show on tiny, unknown AM stations with signals so weak they dissolve under the static created by a car's ignition system."

Marc Fisher, a columnist for The Washington Post, wrote a story in November 2007 that questioned why Tracht hadn't been rehabilitated to the public like other broadcasters: Pat O'Brien, Don Imus, Marv Albert, and Opie and Anthony. All were suspended for bad behavior, some of which was criminal, but all returned to the microphone. Fisher called Tracht "the most talented of the shock jocks, a storyteller so verbally nimble, so fantastically imaginative that his showmanship seemed wasted on an audience of adolescent guys."

Selected Greaseman bits were heard during late PM drive on WGRX-FM 104.5 in the Fredericksburg, Virginia, area. On March 31, 2008, WWDC announced that the Greaseman show would be returning on Saturday mornings beginning April 5, 2008, and that the run would go until October 2008, after Clear Channel decided to have more "music intensive" weekends on DC101.

Jacksonville again
In January 2008, David Israel, the vice president and general manager of Cox Radio in Jacksonville, brought back Bubba the Love Sponge, who was fired in 2004 for indecency. When people asked about Tracht, another former Jacksonville radio personality, Israel tracked him down and they began discussing a job in August 2008. On September 29, 2008, during the Bubba the Love Sponge show, it was announced that Tracht would be returning to Jacksonville to do the afternoon show. This wasn't his first time back since his 1982 departure from WAPE. In the fall of 1996, his show was broadcast via syndication in Jacksonville over WTLK-FM "Real Radio" 106.5, where it lasted until January 1998, when the station changed owners and formats. On October 1, 2008, the Greaseman began his 3–7 p.m. show on WFYV-FM. He planned to originate some of the shows from his Maryland home studio, with the Jacksonville station studio hosting most of the time. According to Tracht, "It's a thrill, frankly, to be back in Jacksonville. This is where the Greaseman bloomed."

On August 10, 2010, the Greaseman didn't host his afternoon show. "Jake" from Kansas City was on the air, and there was no explanation on the WFYV website; all references to Tracht were removed, as well as another DJ, Cowhead.
This notice was posted on the greaseman.org website:
"The Grease Show is no longer airing on Rock105 in Jacksonville. Grease has asked that the Branch Doodadians refrain from sending complaints to Rock105 as it won't change anything. He complements [sic] the staff there and said they just decided to go another direction, and there are no hard feelings. His latest ratings were great. Grease vows to find a new place to shriek sooner or later, and is planning to enjoy the rest of his summer and hopes to be back in action soon!"

Webcast
From 2010 through 2018, The Greaseman was heard on the internet radio station Web Radio Classics (manned by former WRC jocks) from 6 p.m. until midnight Eastern time, with The Greaseman's Ring Dang Doo running from 6 to 10 p.m. and The Greaseman running from 10 p.m. until midnight ET. However, Web Radio Classics shut down on August 31, 2018.
Web Radio Classics, and the Greaseman, have returned and are back in action as of May 1, 2020.

Who's your daddy?
The phrase "Who's your daddy?" may have been given its first widespread airing by Tracht in the late 1980s and 1990s on his syndicated radio program. Tracht used the term comedically but left no doubt about its sexual aspects; Tracht put the phrase in the mouth of his imagined male characters while they were in the middle of "a zesty session."  Tracht said he first heard the reference in The Zombies song "Time of the Season." He said, "I converted it to have a spicy connotation. As men we want validation because we are such inept lovers. [...] It just kind of popped out of the blue."

Movies
Tracht appeared in two television movies produced by his close friend Brian Dennehy: Jack Reed: A Search For Justice (1994) and Jack Reed: Death And Vengeance (1996).

Books

References

External links
 
 A Tribute to The Greaseman: Part 1 - Doug Tracht on 92.3 WXRK New York, March 30, 1993, Airchex
 Grease's new home (Rock 105) with Video, Podcasts, and Blog
 

Living people
American radio DJs
People from the Bronx
People from Jacksonville, Florida
Radio personalities from Washington, D.C.
DeWitt Clinton High School alumni
Ithaca College alumni
Year of birth missing (living people)